Athner tehsil is a fourth-order administrative and revenue division, a subdivision of third-order administrative and revenue division of Betul district of Madhya Pradesh.

Geography
Athner tehsil has an area of 699.64 sq kilometers. It is bounded by Bhainsdehi tehsil in the southwest, west and northwest, Betul tehsil in the north, Multai tehsil in the northeast and east and Maharashtra in the southeast and south.

See also 
Betul district

References 

Tehsils of Madhya Pradesh
Betul district